Li Qiaoxian (born 15 October 1967) is a Chinese diver. She competed in the women's 3 metre springboard event at the 1984 Summer Olympics.

References

1967 births
Living people
Chinese female divers
Olympic divers of China
Divers at the 1984 Summer Olympics
People from Shantou
Asian Games medalists in diving
Divers at the 1986 Asian Games
Asian Games silver medalists for China
Medalists at the 1986 Asian Games
20th-century Chinese women